Walter A. Hill (born August 9, 1946) is an American scientist who is Professor and Dean of the College of Agriculture, Environment and Nutrition Sciences at Tuskegee University. In 2016 he was inducted into the U.S. Department of Agriculture's National Institute of Food and Agriculture Hall of Fame.

Early life and education 
Hill was born in New Brunswick, New Jersey. He is a descendant of the Hill Plantation in South Carolina. His mother was a teacher and his father was an Episcopal minister. At the age of two, Hill's family moved to Oakland, California, He attended Scipio Jones High School, where his academic achievements resulted in him securing a scholarship to study at university. He first studied chemistry at Lake Forest College in Illinois. During his time at Lake Forest, Hill became a leader of the Black student community. He spent his final year at the Free University of Berlin. During his time in Germany, the Assassination of Martin Luther King Jr. took place. He eventually returned to the United States and moved to the University of Chicago for his graduate studies, where he completed a Master of Arts in Teaching in chemistry. After completing his teacher training, Hill worked as a chemistry teacher in the Chicago Public School system. Hill became increasingly interested in a career in agriculture, and moved to the University of Arizona to work toward a master's degree in soil chemistry. He joined the University of Illinois at Urbana–Champaign for his doctoral research, where he specialised in agronomy and environmental chemistry.

Research and career 
Hill moved to Tuskegee University, where he has spent the majority of his academic career. His early research considered sweet potatoes. He spent two years as a research scientist at NASA, where he led the Sweet Patata program. The program was developed as people became concerned about food supplies during long-term manned space missions. Amongst eight crops considered for growth in space, sweet potatoes were the most easy to produce and store. Hill investigated whether sweet potatoes could be grown using hydroponics. At Tuskegee, Hill was named the Director of the George Washington Carver Agricultural Experiment Station. He was made Dean of the College of Agriculture, Environment and Nutrition Sciences in 2012.

Awards and honors 
Hill was awarded an honorary doctorate from Lake Forest College in 2001. In 2005, the Alabama Farmers Federation recognized him with their Service to Agriculture Award. In 2016, he was elected to the United States Department of Agriculture National Institute of Food and Agriculture Hall of Fame. In 2020, The Community of Scholars selected Hill as one of the most inspirational Black scientists in America.

References 

1946 births
Living people
Tuskegee University faculty
African-American scientists
People from New Brunswick, New Jersey
Lake Forest College alumni
University of Arizona alumni
University of Illinois alumni
University of Chicago alumni
21st-century African-American people
20th-century African-American people